Conor McPherson (born 6 August 1971) is an Irish playwright, screenwriter and director of stage and film. In recognition of his contribution to world theatre, McPherson was awarded a doctorate of Literature, Honoris Causa, in June 2013 by the University College Dublin.

Early life
McPherson was born in Dublin. He was educated at University College Dublin and began writing his first plays there as a member of UCD Dramsoc, the college's dramatic society, and went on to found Fly by Night Theatre Company which produced several of his plays. He is considered one of the best contemporary Irish playwrights; his plays have attracted good reviews, and have been performed internationally (notably in the West End and on Broadway).

Career
The Weir opened at the Royal Court before transferring to the West End and Broadway. It won the Laurence Olivier Award for Best New Play for 1999.

In the same year he was one of the recipients of the V Europe Prize Theatrical Realities awarded to the Royal Court Theatre (with Sarah Kane, Mark Ravenhill, Jez Butterworth, Martin McDonagh).

His 2001 play, Port Authority tells of three interwoven lives. The play was first produced by the Gate Theatre of Dublin but premiered at the New Ambassadors Theatre in London in February 2001, before moving to the Gate Theatre in April of that year. The production was directed by McPherson himself. New York's Atlantic Theater Company staged a production of the play in spring of 2008, starring Brian d'Arcy James, and Tony Award winners John Gallagher Jr. and Jim Norton. The New York Times critic Ben Brantley said, "I found myself holding on to what these actors had to say as if I were a five-year-old at bedtime being introduced to The Arabian Nights."

McPherson also directed his play, Dublin Carol, at the Atlantic Theater Company, New York, in 2003.

His 2004 play Shining City opened at the Royal Court and prompted The Daily Telegraph to describe him as "the finest dramatist of his generation". A meditation on regret, guilt and confusion, the play is set entirely within the Dublin offices of a psychiatrist who himself has psychological secrets. Whilst much of the play takes the form of monologues delivered by a patient, the everyday stories and subtle poignancy and humour make it a riveting experience. It subsequently opened on Broadway in 2006 and was nominated for two Tony Awards, including Best Play.

In September 2006, to great critical acclaim, McPherson made his National Theatre debut as both author and director with The Seafarer at the Cottesloe auditorium, starring Karl Johnson and Jim Norton, with Ron Cook as their poker-playing, Mephistophelean guest. Norton won an Olivier Award for his performance while McPherson was nominated for both the Olivier and Evening Standard Awards for Best Play. In October 2007 The Seafarer opened on Broadway, keeping with it most of its creative team, including McPherson as director and both Jim Norton and Conleth Hill in their respective roles, with David Morse taking over as Sharky, and Ciarán Hinds portraying Mr. Lockhart. The production on Broadway received some positive reviews including such statements as "McPherson is quite possibly the finest playwright of his generation" from Ben Brantley at The New York Times and "Succinct, startling and eerie, and the funniest McPherson play to date" from The Observer. Norton's performance as Richard Harkin in The Seafarer at the National Theatre won the 2007 Best Supporting Actor Laurence Olivier Award, and he won a Tony Award in 2008 for Best Featured Actor in a play.

McPherson wrote and directed a stage adaptation of Daphne du Maurier's story The Birds, which opened in September 2009 at the Gate Theatre in Dublin.

In 2011 the National Theatre London premiered his play The Veil at the Lyttleton. Described by The Times as "a cracking fireside tale of haunting and decay" it is set in 1822 and marked McPherson's first foray into period drama. This vein continued with a striking new translation of August Strindberg's The Dance of Death premiered at the Trafalgar Studios in London at the end of 2012. His version was described as "a profoundly seminal work" by The Guardian which also managed, The Times said, to be "Shockingly funny".

The Donmar Warehouse mounted a season of McPherson's work in 2013 with a revival of The Weir and the world premiere of The Night Alive. The Weir was hailed once again as "A modern classic" by The Daily Telegraph and "A contemporary classic" by The Guardian while The Night Alive was nominated for the Laurence Olivier Award for Best Play and described as "Another triumph" by The Independent on Sunday and "A masterstroke" by Time Out. The Financial Times said "sees the Irish playwright at his compassionate best."

The Night Alive transferred to the Atlantic Theatre New York, where it was awarded the New York Drama Critics Circle Award for Best Play 2014, and also received Best Play nominations from the Drama Desk and Lucille Lortell Awards

McPherson's play Girl from the North Country, where the dramatic action is broken up by 20 songs by Bob Dylan, opened at London's The Old Vic on 26 July 2017. The play is set in a hotel in 1934 in Duluth, Minnesota, the birthplace of Dylan. The project began when Dylan's office approached McPherson and suggested creating a play using Dylan songs. The drama received favorable reviews.

Screenplays
The film of his first screenplay, I Went Down, was critically acclaimed and a great commercial success. His first feature film as a director, Saltwater, won the CICAE award for Best Film at the Berlin Film Festival. His second feature film was The Actors, which he wrote and directed.

He is the director and co-writer of The Eclipse, a film which had its world premiere at the 2009 Tribeca Film Festival. It was picked up for distribution by Magnolia Pictures and was released in US cinemas in spring 2010. The film subsequently won the Melies D'Argent Award for Best European Film at Sitges in Spain – the world's premier horror and fantasy genre festival. At The 2010 Irish Film and television Awards The Eclipse won the awards for Best Film and Best Screenplay. Ciarán Hinds won the Best Actor Award at the Tribeca Film Festival for his portrayal of Michael Farr.

In 2013, he wrote the last episode of Quirke. In 2020, he co-wrote the feature film adaptation of the Artemis Fowl books by Eoin Colfer. In response to the COVID-19 pandemic, it was released digitally worldwide on Disney+ on June 12, 2020.

Influences
McPherson has cited James Joyce and Stanley Kubrick as two of his "heroes".

Theatre awards
Theatre-related awards won by McPherson include:

Europe Prize Theatrical Realities (with the Royal Court Theatre)
Stewart Parker Award  The Good Thief
Meyer Whitworth Award This Lime Tree Bower
Guinness/Royal National Theatre Ingenuity Award This Lime Tree Bower
Pearson TV Writer in Residence Award This Lime Tree Bower
Evening Standard Award The Weir
George Devine Award The Weir
Critics Circle Award The Weir
Laurence Olivier Award The Weir

Tony Award nomination for Best Play Shining City
Tony Award nominations for Best Play and Best Director The Seafarer
Laurence Olivier and Evening Standard nominations for Best Play The Seafarer
Manchester Evening News Award Best Touring Production The Seafarer
Laurence Olivier Award nomination Best Play "The Night Alive"
New York Drama Critics Circle Award Best Play "The Night Alive"
Lucille Lortel Award Best Play nomination "The Night Alive"
Drama Desk Award Best Play nomination "The Night Alive"
Laurence Olivier Award nomination Best Musical "Girl from the North Country (musical)"
Tony Award nomination for Best Direction of a Musical and Best Book of a Musical Girl from the North Country

Plays

 Rum and Vodka (1992)
 The Good Thief (1994)
 This Lime Tree Bower (1995)
 St. Nicholas (1997)
 The Weir (1997)
 Dublin Carol (2000)
 Port Authority (2001)
 Come on Over (2001)
 Shining City (2004)

 Poor Beast in the Rain (director only) (2005)
 The Seafarer (2006)
 The Birds (adaptation) (2009)
 The Veil (2011)
 The Dance of Death (adaptation) (2012)
 The Night Alive (2013)
 The Nest (adaptation) (2016).
 Girl from the North Country (2017)
 Uncle Vanya (adaptation) (2020)

Filmography

References

Further reading 
Allen Randolph, Jody. "Conor McPherson." Close to the Next Moment: Interviews from a Changing Ireland. Manchester: Carcanet 2010.
Grunert, Andrea. "The Eclipse" in: Enzyklopädie des Phantastischen Films, Meitingen: Corian Verlag, 90 (June 2010):1–8, .
Chambers, Lilian & Jordan, Eamonn. "The Theatre of Conor McPherson: Right Beside the Beyond". Carysfort Press 2012. 
Wolfe, Graham. "Staging Everyday Ghosts: Conor McPherson’s Shining City." Journal of the Fantastic in the Arts 24.2 (2013): 118–211.
Wolfe, Graham. "Really Existing Ghosts: A Spectral Reading of Conor McPherson's The Veil." Performance Research 23.3 (2018): 113-123.

External links
 Interview with Conor McPherson for The Eclipse, IFC.com

 Comprehensive Playography
 Article on The Birds, by Andréa Grunert, objectif-cinema.com, November 2009 
 Interview with Conor McPherson, by Andréa Grunert, March 2010 
 Review: THE ECLIPSE, by Andréa Grunert, February 2011
 Conor McPherson at Doollee

1971 births
Living people
20th-century Irish dramatists and playwrights
20th-century Irish male writers
21st-century Irish dramatists and playwrights
21st-century Irish male writers
Alumni of University College Dublin
Irish male dramatists and playwrights
Irish theatre directors
Irish film directors
Irish screenwriters
Irish male screenwriters
People from County Dublin